Cond Peak is a mountain summit located in the Columbia Mountains of British Columbia, Canada. The mountain was named for Lieutenant Frederick Thomas Piercy Cond, who served in the Royal Naval Reserve during World War I.

References

Two-thousanders of British Columbia
Columbia Mountains
Regional District of Central Kootenay
Kootenay Land District